Go-Get-'Em, Haines is a 1936 American mystery film directed by Sam Newfield. It was William Boyd's last non-Hopalong Cassidy role.

Plot
Ace reporter Steve Haines is on the trail of Edward Baldwin, the former head of a public utilities company that has bankrupted and defrauded its investors out of their life savings. Haines trails Baldwin to an ocean liner where he is planning to flee to Europe. During the voyage Haines is impressed by the company on the ship, including a famous actor and his singing daughter and a gangster. Haines organises a pantomime melodrama to entertain the passengers using his new acquaintances and convinces Baldwin to take a role playing a man who is murdered. Prior to going on the stage the fake revolver is replaced with a real one.

Production
The film was shot on an actual liner travelling from Los Angeles to Panama.  Famed in his Western role of Hopalong Cassidy, Bill Boyd appeared in three 1936 films of non Western genre for Winchester Productions all produced by George A. Hirliman, directed by Sam Newfield, and released by Republic Pictures. The other films were Burning Gold (1936 film) and Federal Agent.

Cast
William Boyd as Steve Haines
Sheila Terry as Jane Kent
Eleanor Hunt as Gloria Palmer
Lloyd Ingraham as Ship Captain Ward
LeRoy Mason as Tony Marchetti
Jimmy Aubrey as Reggie Parks
Clarence Geldart as Henry Kent
Lee Shumway as John Graham, posing as Frank Marion
Louis Natheaux as Lindner, the Steward

Soundtrack
Eleanor Hunt - "Oh Willie, Oh Willie, Come Back" (Written by Bernie Grossman and Sam Perry)
Eleanor Hunt - "I'm So Sorry We Ever Met" (Written by Bernie Grossman and Sam Perry)

Availability
Go-Get-'Em, Haines is now in the public domain. It is available from Alpha Video on a double-bill with The Laps to Go. The film can also be viewed and downloaded for free via the Internet Archive.

Notes

External links

1936 films
1930s mystery films
American mystery films
American black-and-white films
Films set on ships
Republic Pictures films
1930s English-language films
Films directed by Sam Newfield
1930s American films